Ann M. Sperber (born Aenne Sperber; June 20, 1935 – February 11, 1994) was an American author known for her biographies of Edward R. Murrow and Humphrey Bogart. A native of Vienna, Sperber graduated from Barnard College and was a Fulbright Scholar in Germany. Her biography of Murrow was a finalist for the Pulitzer Prize for Biography or Autobiography in 1987. The Ann M. Sperber Prize is an annual award given by Fordham University that recognizes outstanding biographies of journalists.

Early life
Sperber was born in Vienna to Manfred and Liselotte Sperber. Manfred Sperber, an Austrian citizen, met Liselotte in the German city of Mannheim. They had moved from Germany to Austria in 1933, shortly after Hitler's appointment as German chancellor. Manfred Sperber was trained in law, and he worked as an auditor for the DeFaKa group of department stores until the Jewish Boycott. Thereafter, he served as an accountant for the Jewish community in Vienna. Aenne Sperber was born there on June 20, 1935. 

Liselotte and Aenne Sperber attempted to sail to Cuba in May 1939, but they were held in France for several months when Cuba refused entry to their ship. They were granted American visas that October, and Aenne took the name Ann when she and her mother arrived in the United States. Manfred Sperber joined them in the U.S. in 1940. 

After graduating from Barnard College in 1956, Sperber was a Fulbright Scholar in Germany. While she was there, she conducted the beginnings of her research on Edward R. Murrow. She then worked as children's book editor for Putnam and McGraw-Hill.

Writing
Thirty years after her stint in Germany, Sperber finished a biography of Murrow entitled Murrow: His Life and Times. "If an author's effort could produce a good biography, Murrow would be a masterpiece," wrote Walter Goodman in The New York Times.  "A. M. Sperber seems to have read everything by and about the widely admired radio-television journalist Edward R. Murrow, who died in 1965, and to have talked with everybody who knew him. Unfortunately, her devotion overwhelms her discrimination... There is much interesting material here from an eventful life, but it is submerged in a welter of anecdotes, quotes and excerpts, many of them tangential or repetitious. Despite the criticism, the book was one of four finalists for the Pulitzer Prize for Biography or Autobiography in 1987.

Sperber spent several years researching the life of Humphrey Bogart, conducting 150 interviews and examining the Warner Bros. archives at the University of Southern California. She died on February 11, 1994; she was thought to have suffered a heart attack. After Sperber's death, Lax formed Sperber's research into a complete narrative, and Bogart was published in 1997. The two co-authors never met each other. Writing for the Los Angeles Times, film critic David Thomson said that Sperber and Lax "have written a book that sets standards for research and evidence in the life of an actor."

Sperber Prize
Liselotte Sperber, who lived to be 103 years old, established the Ann M. Sperber Prize at Fordham University in 1999. The award recognizes the best biographies of journalists. The award winners, their books, and the subjects of their books, are shown below. (Information is not available for 2004 and 2008.)

References

Further reading

External links
Ann M. Sperber Prize

1935 births
1994 deaths
Barnard College alumni
American biographers
Writers from New York City